Prince Nikolai Vasilyevich Repnin (– ) was an Imperial Russian statesman and general from the Repnin princely family who played a key role in the dissolution of the Polish–Lithuanian Commonwealth.

Rule of Poland 
Born in Saint Petersburg, Prince Repnin served in the Imperial Army under his father, Prince Vasily Anikitovich Repnin, during the Rhenish campaign of 1748, and subsequently resided for some time abroad, where he acquired "a thoroughly sound German education." He also participated, in a subordinate capacity, in the Seven Years' War.

In 1763, Emperor Peter III sent him to Prussia as ambassador. The same year, Catherine transferred him to Poland as minister plenipotentiary; in Warsaw he was rumored to have had an affair with Izabela Fleming (and to have fathered Adam Jerzy Czartoryski).

Due to the level of Russian control of the Polish government, Repnin was the effective ruler of the country, with special instructions to form a pro-Russian faction from among the various Protestants, who were to receive equal rights with the Catholics. Repnin believed that the Protestants were not significant enough to benefit Russia; at the same time, the Protestant community itself petitioned Empress Catherine, requesting not to be involved.

In order to further Russian interests, he encouraged the creation of two Protestant confederations (of Sluck and Toruń) and later, a Catholic one (the Radom Confederation, led by Karol Stanisław "Panie Kochanku" Radziwiłł). According to the Encyclopædia Britannica Eleventh Edition, Repnin's correspondence reveals that he disliked the type of politics he was required to engage in. Nevertheless, he obeyed his instructions, and used various means to force the 1767–68 Sejm (the "Repnin Sejm") to concede all points in dispute. Before the Sejm, he ordered the capture and exile to Kaluga of some vocal opponents of his policies — Józef Andrzej Załuski and Wacław Rzewuski. The immediate result was the formation of the Bar Confederation, which practically demolished the ambassador's strategy.

Military career 
Repnin resigned his post to lead troops against the Ottoman Empire in the Russo-Turkish War. At the head of an independent command in Moldavia and Wallachia, he prevented a large Ottoman army from crossing the Pruth (1770), distinguished himself at the actions of Larga and Kagul, and captured Izmail and Kilia. In 1771 he received the supreme command in Wallachia and occupied Bucharest. A quarrel with the commander-in-chief, Rumyantsev, then induced him to send in his resignation, but in 1774 he participated in the capture of Silistria and in the negotiations which led to the peace of Kuchuk-Kainarji. In 1775-76 Repnin and his factotum, Yakov Bulgakov, represented Russian interests at the Porte.

On the outbreak of the War of the Bavarian Succession he led 30,000 men to Breslau, and at the subsequent congress of Teschen, where he was Russian plenipotentiary, compelled Austria to make peace with Prussia.

During the second Turkish war (1787-92) Repnin was, after Alexander Suvorov, the most successful of the Russian commanders. He defeated the Ottomans at Salcia, captured the whole camp of the seraskier, Hassan Pasha, shut him up in Izmail, and was preparing to reduce the place when he was forbidden to do so by Grigori Alexandrovich Potemkin (1789). On the retirement of Potemkin in 1791, Repnin succeeded him as commander-in-chief, and immediately routed the grand vizier at Măcin, a victory which compelled the Ottomans to accept the truce of Galaţi (31 July 1791).

Declining years 

After the Second Partition of Poland, he was made governor-general of the newly acquired Lithuanian provinces, where he also commanded the Russian forces during the Kościuszko Uprising.  Tsar Paul I raised him to the rank of field marshal (1796), and in 1798 sent him on a diplomatic mission to Berlin and Vienna to detach Prussia from France and unite the Habsburg monarchy and Prussia against the First French Republic. Unsuccessful, upon his return he was dismissed from service and died in Riga.

Repnin had an illegitimate son, Ivan Pnin, and it was widely rumored that Adam Jerzy Czartoryski was the fruit of a liaison between Repnin and Izabela Fleming.  Repnin's legitimate children were three daughters. Upon his death, as the male Repnin line became extinct, Alexander I permitted Repnin's grandson prince Nikolai Repnin-Volkonsky to assume the Repnin name and his grandfather's coat-of-arms.

See also
 Ambassadors and envoys from Russia to Poland (1763–1794)
 Ivan Pnin

References

Citations

Catholic Encyclopedia article "Poland"
Richard Butterwick, Poland's Last King and English Culture, Oxford University Press, 1998
Giacomo Casanova, History of My life, Johns Hopkins University Press, 1997
 Isabel de Madariaga, Russia in the Age of Catherine the Great, Yale University Press, 1981, ; Phoenix Press, 2002, 
John P. LeDonne, The Grand Strategy of the Russian Empire, 1650-1831, Oxford University Press United States, 2004
Gerhard Albert Ritter, Frederick the Great, University of California Press, 1975

1734 births
1801 deaths
Military personnel from Saint Petersburg
People from Sankt-Peterburgsky Uyezd
Rurikids
Politicians of the Russian Empire
Diplomats of the Russian Empire
Field marshals of Russia
Governors-General of Lithuania
Ambassadors of the Russian Empire to Poland
Ambassadors of the Russian Empire to the Ottoman Empire
Recipients of the Order of St. George of the First Degree
Recipients of the Order of St. George of the Second Degree
Recipients of the Order of the White Eagle (Poland)